The Left Hand of the Electron is a collection of seventeen nonfiction science essays  by American writer and scientist Isaac Asimov, first published by Doubleday & Company in 1972. It was the ninth of a series of books collecting essays from The Magazine of Fantasy and Science Fiction. The title comes from the topic of the first section which deals with chirality of electroweak interactions and chirality of organic compounds and the possible connection between the two.  Other essays in this book concern the effect of electron-spin direction on molecular structure e.g. the "Inverse Sugar" (similar to Inverted sugar syrup) in honey with philosophical reflections on the minority of left handedness in general.

Chapters

A — The Problem of Left and Right
1 — Odds and Evens
2 — The Left Hand of the Electron
3 — Seeing Double
4 — The 3-D Molecule
5 — The Asymmetry of Life
B — The Problem of Oceans
6 — The Thalassogens
7 — Hot Water
8 — Cold Water
C — The Problem of Numbers and Lines
9 — Prime Quality
10 — Euclid's Fifth
11 — The Plane Truth
D — The Problem of the Platypus
12 — Holes in the Head
E — The Problem of History
13 — The Eureka Phenomenon
14 — Pompey and Circumstance
15 — Bill and I
F — The Problem of Population
16 — Stop!
17 — ...But How?

External links
 Asimovonline.com
 

Essay collections by Isaac Asimov
1972 books
Scientific essays
Works originally published in The Magazine of Fantasy & Science Fiction
Doubleday (publisher) books